The women's 1500 metres race of the 2015–16 ISU Speed Skating World Cup 3, arranged in Eisstadion Inzell, in Inzell, Germany, was held on 6 December 2015.

Brittany Bowe of the United States won the race, while compatriot Heather Richardson-Bergsma came second, and Marrit Leenstra of the Netherlands came third. Kali Christ of Canada won the Division B race.

Results
The race took place on Sunday, 6 December, with Division B scheduled in the morning session, at 10:45, and Division A scheduled in the afternoon session, at 14:00.

Division A

Division B

References

Women 1500
3